Xestia cohaesa is a moth of the family Noctuidae. It is found in the eastern part of the Mediterranean basin and in the Near East and Middle East.

Adults are on wing from September to November. There is one generation per year.

The larvae feed on various herbaceous plants, including Poaceae.

Subspecies
Xestia cohaesa cohaesa (Italy, Greece to Bulgaria, Turkey, Transcaucasia, Lebanon, Israel, Iraq, Iran)
Xestia cohaesa lineata (Ukraine, Crimea, Caucasus, Turkmenistan)

External links
 Noctuinae of Israel

Xestia
Moths of Europe
Moths of Asia